El Magrun() is a village in the Benghazi District, of the Cyrenaica region in northeastern Libya.

History
El Magrun was named after Sidi Ahmed El Magrun.

El Magrun is the site of a former Italian concentration camp for the nomadic tribes that lived in Eastern Libya (Cyrenaica), and for those in the Libyan resistance movement, during the colonial Italian North Africa and Italian Libya periods.

Geography
El Magrun is located 80 km south of Benghazi and 80 km north of Ajdabiya.

The village is linked with Benghazi by two roads: The Benghazi-Qaminis-Magrun road (part of Libyan Coastal Highway), and the Benghazi-Suluq-Magrun road.

Notes

Populated places in Benghazi District
Italian concentration camps
World War II sites in Libya
Cyrenaica